Phostria xanthoproctalis is a moth in the family Crambidae. It was described by George Hampson in 1918. It is found in Venezuela.

The wingspan is about 46 mm. The forewings are uniform glossy grey brown tinged with purple. The hindwings are glossy grey brown tinged with purple, the inner area slightly paler.

References

Phostria
Moths described in 1918
Moths of South America